Tova may refer to:

Tova, name
Test of Variables of Attention (T.O.V.A.), a neuropsychological assessment

See also

Shana tova, a Rosh Hashanah greeting
"Shanah Tova" (song), Hebrew children's song
Mita Tova, Hebrew name for The Farewell Party, 2014 Israeli film
TOA (disambiguation)
Toba (disambiguation)
Toga (disambiguation)
Toka (disambiguation)
Tola (disambiguation)
Toma (disambiguation)
Tora (disambiguation)
Tovar (disambiguation)
Tove (disambiguation)
Toya (disambiguation)
Towa (disambiguation)